Yellow star may refer to:

A yellow star in stellar classification
A yellow badge, a cloth patch that Jews were ordered to wear on their clothes
Any plant of genus Hypoxis in the family Hypoxidaceae
"Yellow Star", a song by Donovan from his album Essence to Essence
The Yellow Star: The Persecution of the Jews in Europe 1933-45, a 1980 documentary film
Yellow Star (novel), a 2006 children's novel describing life in the Lodz Ghetto during World War II
Bora Kim, also known as YellOwStaR, French professional League of Legends player
Yellow Star (film), a 1922 German silent drama film

See also
Gold Star
Honorary Order of the Yellow Star